Poecilognathus relativitae, originally known as Phthiria relativitae, is a species of fly of the family Bombyliidae, subfamily Phthiriinae, that is found in the American Southwest. It was discovered by Neal Evenhuis, who named it as a pun on "theory of relativity".

Subsequent analysis revealed that the insect is not of the genus Phthiria, and it was renamed.

References

Bombyliidae
Diptera of North America
Insects described in 1985